Arya College of Engineering & IT is situated in Kukas, Jaipur. The institute is approved by AICTE, New Delhi and Affiliated with Rajasthan Technical University, Kota in Rajasthan. Arya College is also known as Arya 1st Old Campus. The engineering college focuses higher technical education with well qualified faculty members.

History 
Arya College was established in the year of 2000 by Late Er. T.K. Agarwal Ji, Founder Honourable Chairman. The college ranks amongst the best technological institutions in the State and has contributed to all sectors of technical and professional development. It has also been considered a leading light in the area of education and research in technology.
The College features a perfect blend of four basic ingredients of contemporary education system viz. modern Infrastructure, Faculty, Management and Academics.

Campus 
The institute has a rich and modern infrastructure with lush green lawns.

College campus having large buildings of separate departments, well equipped laboratories, modern library, well maintained spacious auditoriums, well-furnished hostels with AC rooms, wi-fi, temple, cafeteria, playground, lawn, parking and lot many more.

Departments 
Artificial Intelligence & Data Science
Computer Science & Engineering
Electronics & Communication Engineering
Electrical Engineering
Mechanical Engineering     
Information Technology
MBA (Management Studies)

References 

Engineering colleges in Jaipur
Universities and colleges affiliated with the Arya Samaj
Educational institutions established in 2000
2000 establishments in Rajasthan